Beata Jolanta Grzesik (born 11 June 1979, in Nowy Sącz) is a Polish slalom canoeist who competed at the international level from 1995 to 2000.

She won a silver medal in the K1 event at the 1999 ICF Canoe Slalom World Championships in La Seu d'Urgell. Grzesik also competed in the K1 event at the 2000 Summer Olympics in Sydney where she finished in 19th place after being eliminated in the qualifying round.

References

42-83 from Medal Winners ICF updated 2007.pdf?MenuID=Results/1107/0,Medal_winners_since_1936/1510/0 ICF medalists for Olympic and World Championships - Part 2: rest of flatwater (now sprint) and remaining canoeing disciplines: 1936-2007.

1979 births
Canoeists at the 2000 Summer Olympics
Living people
Olympic canoeists of Poland
Polish female canoeists
Sportspeople from Nowy Sącz
Medalists at the ICF Canoe Slalom World Championships